The 1956 United States presidential election in New Jersey took place on November 6, 1956. All contemporary 48 states were part of the 1956 United States presidential election. Voters chose 16 electors to the Electoral College, which selected the president and vice president.

New Jersey was won overwhelmingly by the Republican nominees, incumbent President Dwight D. Eisenhower of Pennsylvania and his running mate incumbent Vice President Richard Nixon of California. Eisenhower and Nixon defeated the Democratic nominees, former Governor Adlai Stevenson of Illinois and his running mate Senator Estes Kefauver of Tennessee. 

Eisenhower carried New Jersey in a landslide with 64.68% of the vote to Stevenson’s 34.23%, a margin of 30.46%. Eisenhower’s decisive 1956 landslide represented a dramatic swing in the state in his favor. In his initial 1952 match against Stevenson, Eisenhower had also comfortably won New Jersey, but by a smaller margin, taking 56.81% of the vote to Stevenson’s 41.99%, a margin of 14.83%. Eisenhower’s 30.46% margin of victory in 1956 was thus more than double the margin by which he had won the state in 1952, marking a swing of over 15 points in Eisenhower's favor.

Eisenhower's landslide gains in the state were also evident on the county map. Whereas in 1952, Eisenhower had lost 3 counties to Stevenson, in 1956 Eisenhower decisively swept all 21 counties in the state of New Jersey, breaking 60% of the vote in all but three, breaking 70% in seven, and even breaking 80% in rural Sussex County. In urban, Democratic-leaning Hudson County, which Stevenson had narrowly won with a plurality in 1952, Eisenhower won decisively with over 60% of the vote in 1956. Eisenhower also picked up victories in Mercer County and Camden County, both of which had given majorities to Stevenson in 1952. He was only the second presidential nominee to sweep all New Jersey’s counties after Warren G. Harding in 1920.

New Jersey in this era was usually a swing state with a slight Republican lean. However, Eisenhower’s overwhelming personal popularity in the Northeast in 1956 led him to perform unusually strongly in New Jersey. The state usually voted very similarly to the nation as a whole, with a slight Republican tilt, as in 1952 when its results had been just 4% more Republican than the national average. Nevertheless, in 1956 the state swung especially hard in Eisenhower’s favor. Even as Eisenhower won a slightly more convincing victory nationwide than he had in 1952, New Jersey swung much more than the nation, and its result in the 1956 election made the state more than 15% more Republican than the national average, making it the sixth most Republican state in the union.

Hudson County voted Republican for the first time since 1920, and Mercer and Camden counties since 1932.

Results

Results by county

See also
 Presidency of Dwight D. Eisenhower
 United States presidential elections in New Jersey

Notes

References

New Jersey
1956
1956 New Jersey elections